Jana Aastha Weekly is a Nepali-language newspaper that is published from Kathmandu, Nepal. It was established in 1996 and has since become a popular newspaper in Nepal. It is known for its coverage of Political, Entertainment, and Social issues in Nepal.

The newspaper is published every Wednesday and circulated throughout Nepal and SAARC Country. It has a wide readership and is considered to be one of the leading newspapers in the country.

Jana Aastha Weekly covers a range of topics including Politics, Business, Entertainment, Sports, and social issues. The newspaper has a team of experienced journalists and editors who are committed to providing accurate and unbiased news coverage.

In addition to its print edition, Jana Aastha Weekly also has an online edition, which allows readers to access the newspaper's content from anywhere in the world. The online version of Jana Aastha newspaper can be accessed at www.janaaaastha.com or www.janaaasthanews.com.np .

The website provides the latest news and articles from the newspaper in a digital format, making it easy for readers to access the content from anywhere in the world.

On the website, readers can find the latest news and updates from Nepal and around the world. The Jana Aastha Online edition covers news and current events from Nepal as well as international news including Politics, Business, Entertainment, Sports, and social issues. It also includes Editorial pieces, Opinion pieces, and Columns from renowned journalists and experts in their respective fields. Jana Aastha Weekly is known for its independent reporting and editorial stance.

The website is updated regularly with new content, ensuring that readers are always up-to-date with the latest news and events in Nepal. In addition to the news articles, the website also features photo galleries, videos, and other multimedia content related to the news stories. Its website provides up-to-date news and information in the Nepali language. The newspaper is also active on social media platforms such as Facebook, Messenger, WhatsApp, and Twitter.

The Jana Aastha Online edition is accessible for free and does not require any subscription or registration. Readers can simply visit the website and start reading the news and articles right away. Jana Aastha News Online also has a mobile app that can be downloaded from the Google Play Store for Android users and the IOS Play store for Apple users. The app provides breaking news alerts and notifications to keep users up-to-date on the latest happenings in Nepal and beyond.

Overall, Jana Aastha News Online is a reliable source of news and information for those who prefer to read their news in Nepali.

Jana Aastha has the largest circulation among the weeklies all over the country & it leads 80 percent of the weekly print media of Nepal, this has been certified in A plus category by the Nepal government's Audit Bureau of Circulation (ABC), its editor Kishor Shrestha also represents as the secretary general in World Association of Press Councils (WAPC).

He had been jailed twice during the autocratic panchayat regime struggling for democracy. Mr. Shrestha has been working in the media sector for the last 36 years whereas Jana Aastha has a history of 29 years.

External links
 

Newspapers published in Nepal
Publications with year of establishment missing
1993 establishments in Nepal